Viktor Vasilyevich Kuznetsov (born 25 February 1949) is a retired Soviet football player and a Ukrainian coach.

He has three brothers Serhiy Kuznetsov, Hryhoriy Kuznetsov, and Vasyl Kuznetsov.

Honours
 Soviet Top League winner: 1972.
 Soviet Cup winner: 1981.
 UEFA European Under-19 Championship winner: 1967.

International career
Kuznetsov made his debut for USSR on 29 June 1972 in a friendly against Uruguay. He played in the 1974 FIFA World Cup qualifiers .

References

External links
 Profile 
 

1949 births
Living people
People from Saky Raion
Soviet footballers
Soviet Union international footballers
Ukrainian footballers
Ukrainian football managers
Soviet Top League players
SC Tavriya Simferopol players
FC SKA Rostov-on-Don players
Ukrainian Premier League managers
FC Kryvbas Kryvyi Rih managers
FC Shakhtar Luhansk managers
Association football midfielders